Telesistema 11 is a free-to-air television network based in the Dominican Republic. The station broadcasts on channel 11 in the NTSC standard and is owned by Grupo Corripio.

References

External links
  

Television stations in the Dominican Republic